The Jaunpur train crash was a rail accident that occurred on 13 May 2002 in Uttar Pradesh, India. Subsequent investigation indicated that the cause was removal of plates that bind stretches of rail.

Overview
The Shramjeevi Express was travelling from New Delhi to Patna when it hit a broken rail near Jaunpur, Uttar Pradesh shortly before 4:00 am on 12 May 2002. Carriages were thrown into the air and dragged off the rails, some into each other.

There was no fire, and local people and emergency services rescued travellers from the wreckage. 80 passengers were injured and received medical care at local hospitals. Twelve passengers in a carriage that rolled over were killed.

Local police established that fishplates were missing from the rails, thus causing the rails to shift out of alignment as successive trains passed over them. The plates were found in the vicinity, suggesting deliberate removal.

References

See also 
 1939 City of San Francisco Derailment
 2005 Jaunpur train bombing
 Uttar Pradesh train accidents

2002 disasters in India
21st-century mass murder in India
Mass murder in 2002
Transport in Jaunpur, Uttar Pradesh
Terrorist incidents in India in 2002
Train wrecks caused by sabotage
Railway accidents in 2002
Jaunpur, Uttar Pradesh
Railway accidents and incidents in Uttar Pradesh
History of Uttar Pradesh (1947–present)
Terrorist incidents in Uttar Pradesh
May 2002 events in Asia